Kirensk is a town and the administrative center of Kirensky District in Irkutsk Oblast, Russia, located at the confluence of the Kirenga and Lena Rivers,  north of Irkutsk, the administrative center of the oblast. Population:

Geography
The town is located in the Lena-Angara Plateau.

History
It was founded in 1630 by the Cossacks under Vasily Bugor as a winter settlement called Nikolsky pogost. Along with Ust-Kut, it was one of the two main portages between the Yenisei and Lena basins. In the 1630s, Yerofey Khabarov ran a salt works here. In 1665, it was renamed Kirensky Ostrog. In 1775, it was granted town status. In the 19th century, a large number of political prisoners were forcibly resettled here, among whom was Józef Piłsudski. Under Stalin there was a GULAG transit camp. In 1991, over eighty bodies were found buried in the basement of the former NKVD building. All were said to have been killed on a single day in 1938 and all were killed by blows on the head, apparently to hide the noise. During the construction of the Baikal–Amur Mainline, goods were shipped up the Kirenga to Magistralny. In the 1970s, a dam was built across one mouth of the Kirenga (the place was originally an island) to reduce flooding and ice jams. In 2001, there was a major flood.

Administrative and municipal status
Within the framework of administrative divisions, Kirensk serves as the administrative center of Kirensky District, to which it is directly subordinated. As a municipal division, the town of Kirensk, together with nine rural localities in Kirensky District, is incorporated within Kirensky Municipal District as Kirenskoye Urban Settlement.

Economy

Transportation
There is ship transport along the Lena in summer and an airport, but no railroad, and no proper road link to the rest of Russia. The port is used to transfer goods to smaller ships going further up the Lena.

The town is served by the Kirensk Airport. During World War II, it was a staging point for American aircraft transferred to Russia via Alaska.

Climate
Kirensk has a subarctic climate (Köppen climate classification Dfc). Precipitation is quite low and is significantly higher in summer than at other times of the year.

Notable people from Kirensk
Daniel Broido (1903-1990), computer engineer

References

Notes

Sources

Registry of the Administrative-Territorial Formations of Irkutsk Oblast 

Cities and towns in Irkutsk Oblast
Irkutsk Governorate
Populated places on the Lena River